Tonggalan is an administrative subdistrict in Klaten Tengah, Klaten Regency, Central Java, Indonesia. Tonggalan was be divided several small villages more, including Jamalan Kidul, Jamalan Lor, Mlinjon, Randualas, Candirejo (small village in Tonggalan), Klaseman, Kauman (small village in Tonggalan).

References

Tonggalan
Tonggalan